Cows Crossing a Ford is an early 19th century painting by French artist Jules Dupré. Done in oil on canvas, the work depicts farmers driving their cattle across a river in Limousin, a region of central France. The way in which the low horizon and sky are rendered in the painting are a testament to Dupré's interest in the works of John Constable and Richard Parkes Bonington, two landscape painters. Cows Crossing a Ford is in the collection of the Metropolitan Museum of Art.

References 

1836 paintings
19th-century paintings
French paintings
Paintings in the collection of the Metropolitan Museum of Art